Massinissa Nezla (born September 13, 1998 in Ouaguenoun) is an Algerian footballer who plays for JS Kabylie in the Algerian Ligue Professionnelle 1.

On September 29, 2022, Nezla made his Algeria A' national football team debut, coming on in the 85th minute substitute in a friendly match against Sudan.

References

External links
 

1998 births
Algeria A' international footballers
Algerian Ligue Professionnelle 1 players
Algerian footballers
JS Kabylie players
Living people
People from Tizi Ouzou Province
Footballers from Tizi Ouzou
Kabyle people